Dirty Dog may refer to:

Music
Dirty Dog (album), a 1966 album by Kai Winding
"Dirty Dog", a song by Claw Boys Claw from Shocking Shades of Claw Boys Claw (1985)
"Dirty Dog", a song by Damn Yankees from Don't Tread (1990)
"Dirty Dog", a song by Juliana Hatfield from In Exile Deo (2004)
"Dirty Dog", a song by Switchblade Symphony from Bread and Jam for Frances (1997)
"Dirty Dog", a song by ZZ Top from Eliminator (1983)
"Dirty Dog", a song by The Beastie Boys from Hello Nasty

Television
Don's Dirty Dog Wash, a fictional franchise from the series Very Small Business
"Dirty Dog", an episode of the series Pocoyo
"Dirty Dog", an episode of the series Rocko's Modern Life
"Dirty Dog", an episode of the series Teletubbies

Literature
Dirty Dog, a fable credited to Aesop

Fictional Characters
Dirty Dog, a character in the first solo-storyboard created by Joseph Barbera in 1935
Dirty Dog, a character from the comic book series Top Dog
Dirty Dog, a character from the Internet cartoon The Goddamn George Liquor Program
Dirty Dog, a character from the Internet cartoon Weekend Pussy Hunt
Dirty Dog, a character from the underground comix Zap Comix

See also
 Dirt Dog (disambiguation)